Lucija Lesjak (born 30 November 1999) is a Croatian karateka. She won one of the bronze medals in the women's +68 kg event at the 2021 World Karate Championships held in Dubai, United Arab Emirates.

She also won one of the bronze medals in the women's team kumite event at the 2021 European Karate Championships held in Poreč, Croatia. In June 2021, she competed at the World Olympic Qualification Tournament held in Paris, France hoping to qualify for the 2020 Summer Olympics in Tokyo, Japan.

She won the gold medal in the women's team kumite event at the 2022 European Karate Championships held in Gaziantep, Turkey. She also competed in the women's +68 kg event where she lost her bronze medal match against Kyriaki Kydonaki of Greece. She competed in the women's +68 kg event at the 2022 Mediterranean Games held in Oran, Algeria where she was eliminated in her first match.

Achievements

References 

Living people
1999 births
Place of birth missing (living people)
Croatian female karateka
Competitors at the 2022 Mediterranean Games
Mediterranean Games competitors for Croatia
21st-century Croatian women